Zannanza (died c. 1324 BC) was a Hittite prince, son of Suppiluliuma I, king of the Hittites. He is best known for almost becoming the Pharaoh of Egypt, and because his death caused a diplomatic incident between the Hittite and Egyptian Empires, resulting in warfare.

Biography
The Egyptian Queen Dakhamunzu, who could have been Meritaten or Nefertiti, but is most often identified as Ankhesenamun, asked Suppiluliuma I to send over a son during the late Eighteenth Dynasty of Egypt because she had recently been widowed by the death of Nibhururia (possibly Akhenaten, but more likely Tutankhamun), and had borne no heir. Her letter reads,

My husband has died and I have no son. They say about you that you have many sons.  You might give me one of your sons to become my husband. I would not wish to take one of my subjects as a husband... I am afraid.

It was extraordinary that a consort from outside of Egypt would be sought, however, so Suppiluliuma was cautious. After sending an envoy to verify her claim, he obliged her. His son, Zannanza, was chosen and sent to Egypt to become the new pharaoh. This could have led to efforts to make Egypt part of the Hittite Empire. Zannanza never made it past the Egyptian border, though exactly what became of him and how he died is unknown.

His father accused the Egyptians of murdering him. The new king of Egypt, Ay, denied the murder, but acknowledged the death. Angry letters were passed between the two nations, but the matter ended inconclusively. Hittite forces subsequently attacked Egyptian settlements in Syria. Sick prisoners of war brought back to the Hittite Empire after these attacks caused a deadly epidemic that spread rapidly throughout the empire. As a result, Suppiluliuma I himself died from the epidemic.

In fiction

 Janet Morris wrote a detailed biographical novel, I, the Sun, whose subject was Suppiluliuma I.  Zannanza is an important figure in this novel.
In the historical fiction manga Red River, Zannanza appeared as a character. Like his inspiration, Zannanza was chosen to become the next Pharaoh after Ankhesenamun sent the letter after Tutankhamun died. While en route to Egypt, he and the rest of his party were ambushed and he was murdered. After the attack, the main character Yuri Suzuki is left alive. She then dissolved any disputes between the two nations whereas in history the Hittites attacked the Egyptian settlements in Syria.
In the historical fiction The Egyptian Zannansa is poisoned on his way to Egypt by the narrator Sinuhe who is sent by Horemheb and the priest Ay who want to prevent the Hittites taking over Egypt.

References

External links
Translations of Egyptian-Hittite correspondence regarding the "Zannanza Affair"
Translated account of Mursili II regarding the affair

People of the Eighteenth Dynasty of Egypt
Hittite people
1320s BC deaths
Year of birth unknown
14th-century BC rulers